Ollie Sapsford (born 7 October 1995) is a New Zealand rugby union player, who currently plays as a midfield back or wing for  in New Zealand's domestic National Provincial Championship competition and for the Brumbies in Super Rugby.

Early life and career

Sapsford hails from Ashburton in the Canterbury Region on the east coast of New Zealand's South Island. He attended Ashburton College and played age grade rugby for Mid Canterbury up to Under 16 level. He didn't play 1st XV rugby at school.

Sapsford left school at the age of 16 and started a building apprenticeship. After finishing his apprenticeship, he left for Western Australia to work on a farm for a year. While there, he played Australian rules football at club level, picking up skills that proved to be helpful in the next phases of his rugby career. After his return to New Zealand, he started playing rugby again and represented Mid Canterbury in the Heartland Championship in 2016.

Following Sapsford's season playing for Mid Canterbury, he was offered a Wellington Rugby Academy contract and played two seasons for the Wellington Development team.

Early 2019, Sapsford moved to Hawke's Bay where he played for Taradale Rugby & Sports in the province's club rugby competition.

Senior career

On 4 August 2019, Sapsford was named in the  squad for the 2019 Mitre 10 Cup season. He made his debut for the Magpies on 11 August 2019 against  and scored his first try for the province on 28 September 2019 in their game against .

In December 2019, Sapsford also represented Hawke's Bay at the Central Region Sevens Tournament and the New Zealand National Rugby Sevens Tournament.

Sapsford was again named in the Hawke's Bay squad for the 2020 and the 2021 season. During the 2020 Mitre 10 Cup season, Sapsford helped the Magpies win the Ranfurly Shield, successfully defend the Shield three times and win the Mitre 10 Cup Championship, thus securing a well-deserved promotion to the Premiership division. The Magpies held on to the Shield during the entire 2021 Bunnings NPC season – winning all six Ranfurly Shield defences – and finished the regular season at the top of the Premiership table. In the regular season game against  on 30 October 2021, Sapsford scored a hat-trick in an eye-catching performance.

From 2017 to 2019, Sapsford played several games for the  Development team. However, it was eventually an Australian Super Rugby franchise that offered him a contract. On 3 November 2021, the  announced that they had signed Sapsford on a two-year deal. He made his Super Rugby debut for his new team on 20 February 2022 against the Western Force.

International career

Following an impressive performance for the Hawke's Bay Sevens team in December 2019, Sapsford was called up to train with the All Blacks Sevens Development squad. In February 2020, he was one of the newly contracted players who were added to the All Blacks Sevens team that prepared for the 2020 Summer Olympics. One month later, World Rugby postponed all remaining tournaments of the 2019–20 World Rugby Sevens Series due to the COVID-19 pandemic and cancelled them altogether on 30 June 2020. The 2020 Olympics were postponed to 2021.

Sapsford was among the All Blacks Sevens players contracted for 2021 and was named among the non-travelling reserves for the men's rugby sevens tournament at the 2020 Summer Olympics. Again due to impact of the COVID-19 pandemic, the All Blacks Sevens did not compete at the only two tournaments of the 2021 World Rugby Sevens Series.

All in all, despite being part of the 2020 and 2021 All Blacks Sevens squad, Sapsford only had the opportunity to play for the team in warm-up matches against the Australian Sevens team during the Trans-Tasman Sevens tournament in May 2021.

Reference list

External links
NZ Rugby History profile
itsrugby.co.uk profile

1995 births
Living people
People educated at Ashburton College
New Zealand rugby union players
New Zealand male rugby sevens players
Rugby union centres
Rugby union wings
Hawke's Bay rugby union players
ACT Brumbies players